The Solkan Bridge is a  arch bridge over the Soča River near Nova Gorica in western Slovenia (by railway terminology it is a viaduct). It holds this record because later construction technology used reinforced concrete to build bridges. It was originally built to carry the Bohinj Railway in the time of the Vienna Secession, between 1900 and 1905, and officially opened in 1906.

Description
The bridge was designed by the architect Rudolf Jaussner and engineer Leopold Oerley, initially with an  stone arch. The bridge was built by the Viennese construction company Brüder Redlich und Berger between 1904 and 1905. It is built of 4,533 stone blocks.

On July 19, 1906, the Bohinj Railway from Jesenice to Gorizia was inaugurated (the Austrian heir Franz Ferdinand travelled across the bridge).

In August 1916, during the First World War, Austrian soldiers destroyed the bridge (using  of Ecrasite) as they left Solkan to prevent the invading forces from using it. After the 12. Isonzo battle the Austrian army built a steel construction where the bridge once stood. After the war in April 1925 the Italians started to build a new bridge, which was finished in 1927. This bridge was very similar to the first one, with the exception of having only four sub-arches instead of the original five.

During the Second World War the bridge suffered only minimal damage from bomb attacks. On August 10, 1944, bombs did not hit the bridge; on March 15, 1945, a bomb that hit the bridge did not explode.

Literature  
 Gorazd Humar: Kamniti velikan na Soči. Branko, Nova Gorica 1996, .
 Gorazd Humar, Bogdan Kladnik: Slovenski Mostovi: Bridges of Slovenia. Teil 2: Štajerska, Dolenjska, Gorenjska, Prekmurje. Zaklad, Ljubljana 2002, .
 Eduard Jordan (2013): Der Eisbahnviadukt von Solkan/Salcano 
 Walther Schaumann: Die Bahnen zwischen Ortler und Isonzo 1914 - 1918. Vom Friedensfahrplan zur Kriegsfahrordnung. Bohmann Verlag, Wien 1991.

References

External links

Railway bridges in Slovenia
Viaducts in Slovenia
Arch bridges in Slovenia
Bridges completed in 1905
City Municipality of Nova Gorica
Bridges over the Soča
Buildings and structures in the Slovenian Littoral
Soča Valley
Stone arch bridges
1905 establishments in Austria-Hungary
20th-century architecture in Slovenia